Nisha Chaudhary (1952–2001) was a social and political social worker and was elected to Lok Sabha from the Sabarkantha constituency in the Indian state of Gujarat thrice in the 1990s, as an Indian National Congress candidate.

Personal life
She was born Nisha Gameti on 10 September 1952 in the Saclawada, district Dungarpur in the Indian state of Rajasthan. She divorced her husband, with whom she had two children, in 1990. In late 1980s she was a companion of former CM Amarsinh B. Chaudhary. The couple married on 13 July 1991. The wedding caused controversy because Amarsinh Chaudhary was still married to his first wife Gajraben with whom he had 3 children. Nisha was elected to Lok Sabha in 1996, 1998 and 1999, and died in 2001 in the middle of her term as Lok Sabha member.

Education & Interests
Nisha was an M.A in Sociology. She was educated at Birla Institute, Pilani and Rajasthan University, Jaipur. Nisha's hobbies included singing, playing music and classical dances. Nisha is a sportsperson and participated in several sports like hockey, tennis and badminton. She was also a member of the National Cadet Corps and also attended Republic Day Contingent Camp in New Delhi for many years.

Career
Nisha had worked as a Radio Artist in All India Radio, Jaipur. 
As a Chairman of the State Social Welfare Advisory Board, Nisha worked for women and child welfare and towards the advancement of backward classes, particularly the tribals. All throughout her career she has been associated with several social and educational institutions and continues to work for the underprivileged.

Nisha Chaudhary died in 2001. Madhusudan Mistry of Congress won the Lok Sabha bye-poll, necessitated by her death.

References 

Women in Gujarat politics
1952 births
2001 deaths
Living people
Articles created or expanded during Women's History Month (India) - 2014
People from Dungarpur district
People from New Delhi
All India Radio people
Indian National Congress politicians from Gujarat
Lok Sabha members from Gujarat
20th-century Indian women politicians
20th-century Indian politicians
All India Radio women
India MPs 1996–1997
India MPs 1998–1999
India MPs 1999–2004
Women members of the Lok Sabha
21st-century Indian women politicians